Moracizine or moricizine, sold under the trade name Ethmozine, is an antiarrhythmic of class IC. It was used for the prophylaxis and treatment of serious and life-threatening ventricular arrhythmias, but was withdrawn in 2007 for commercial reasons.

Pharmacology
Moracizine, a phenothiazine derivative, undergoes extensive first-pass metabolism and is also extensively metabolized after it has entered the circulation. It may have pharmacologically active metabolites. A clinical study has shown that moracizine is slightly less effective than encainide or flecainide in suppressing ventricular premature depolarizations. Compared with disopyramide and quinidine, moracizine was equally or more effective in suppressing premature ventricular contractions, couplets, and nonsustained ventricular tachycardia.

In the Cardiac Arrhythmia Suppression Trial (CAST), a large study testing the influence of antiarrhythmics on mortality, showed a statistically non-significant increase of mortality from 5.4 to 7.2% under moracizine. This is in line with other class IC antiarrhythmics.

Synthesis
Note: The carbamate structure reminds the reader of Gastrophenzine or particularly Ethacizine.

The amide formation between Phenothiazine-2-ethylcarbamate [37711-29-8] (1) and 3-Chloropropionyl chloride [625-36-5] (2) gives ethyl N-[10-(3-chloropropanoyl)phenothiazin-2-yl]carbamate [119407-03-3] [34749-22-9] (3). Displacement of the remaining ω-halogen by morpholine (4) then completes the synthesis of Moricizine (5).

References 

Antiarrhythmic agents
Sodium channel blockers
Phenothiazines
4-Morpholinyl compunds
Carbamates
Abandoned drugs
Drugs in the Soviet Union